The 1985–86 Greek Football Cup was the 44th edition of the Greek Football Cup.

Tournament details

Totally 76 teams participated, 16 from Alpha Ethniki, 20 from Beta, and 40 from Gamma. It was held in 7 rounds, included final. An Additional Round was held between First and Second, with 6 matches, in order that the teams would continue to be 32.

It was an interesting edition, with the eternal enemies, Panathinaikos and Olympiacos, to contest the Final after 11 years. Olympiacos had eliminated "big three of Thessaloniki" (PAOK, Aris, and Iraklis), while Panathinaikos only one Alpha Ethniki team, AEK Athens, in semi-finals. In the Final, that was held in Olympic Stadium, the common home of all three teams of former P.O.K. that year, Panathinaikos achieved an impressive 4–0 victory against their opponent, completing one successful season with the win of The Double.

There were nevertheless many unusual events. Cup holders, AEL, were eliminated by Panseraikos in the First Round. Also, Panionios eliminated by Naoussa. PAOK struggled to qualify against Anagennisi Giannitsa, with score 6–5 in penalty shootout. Finally, it was memorable in the fact that HFF allocated the 1/5 of crude income of the Final in favour of the aims of UNICEF.

Calendar

Knockout phase
Each tie in the knockout phase, apart from the first two rounds and the final, was played over two legs, with each team playing one leg at home. The team that scored more goals on aggregate over the two legs advanced to the next round. If the aggregate score was level, the away goals rule was applied, i.e. the team that scored more goals away from home over the two legs advanced. If away goals were also equal, then extra time was played. The away goals rule was again applied after extra time, i.e. if there were goals scored during extra time and the aggregate score was still level, the visiting team advanced by virtue of more away goals scored. If no goals were scored during extra time, the winners were decided by a penalty shoot-out. In the first two rounds and the final, which were played as a single match, if the score was level at the end of normal time, extra time was played, followed by a penalty shoot-out if the score was still level.The mechanism of the draws for each round is as follows:
There are no seedings, and teams from the same group can be drawn against each other.

First round

|}

Additional round

|}

Bracket

Round of 32

|}

Round of 16

|}

Quarter-finals

|}

Semi-finals

|}

Final

The 42nd Greek Cup Final was played at the Olympic Stadium.

References

External links
Greek Cup 1985-86 at RSSSF

Greek Football Cup seasons
Greek Cup
Cup